Deadly Apples is a Canadian rock / industrial metal band based in Montreal, Quebec.  The band consists of frontman / lyricist Alex Martel (vocals) and main composer Antoine Lamothe (drums), with live musicians joining them on stage. 

An early version of the project was formed in 2007 when Martel joined forces with Lamothe.  During this initial period, the band released the Infected EP in 2008.  They started work on their first full-length album Petty in 2010, which was mixed by Vance Powell, mastered by Bob Ludwig and features Munky from Korn as guest guitarist on the songs Further and Help.  The project then went on hiatus for several years while Martel and Lamothe focused on their concert promoter and film director careers, respectively.

In 2017, the current version of Deadly Apples was formed with the band supporting Rammstein in Canada and releasing several songs from the Petty album along with a music video for Further directed by Lamothe.  In 2018, they toured for two months with Marilyn Manson and Rob Zombie on the US Twins of Evil Tour.  They also toured Japan with Korn and South America with Deftones, as well as several festivals such as Vans Warped Tour, Knotfest Mexico and Hell & Heaven Fest.  The band is known for its very intense and energetic live performances.

History

Initial period, Infected, Petty: 2007-2011

In 2007, Martel teamed up with Antoine Lamothe to form the initial version of Deadly Apples.  In 2008, they released the Infected EP. A music video directed by Lamothe was shot for the song Self Inflicted Oppression, but was never released.

In 2009, the band premiered a stripped down electroacoustic set, opening for the cross-Canada tour of Blindoldfreak, solo project of Nine Inch Nails keyboard player Alessandro Cortini.  Following that run, the band continued touring with both their usual and stripped down sets, performing at several festivals in Canada and the U.S., including large-scale festival stops with Korn at Rock On! Fest in New Hampshire and Heavy Mtl in Montreal.

In 2010, Deadly Apples started work on the full-length album Petty, which was mixed by Vance Powell, mastered by Bob Ludwig and features Munky from Korn as guest guitarist on the songs Further and Help.  Once the album was completed in 2011, the project went on hiatus for several years while Martel and Lamothe focused on their concert promoter and film director careers, respectively.

In 2011, Paul Barker of Puscifer and formerly Ministry remixed the song Self Inflicted Oppression with samples from Ministry's Psalm 69.  The remix was featured on the soundtrack for the documentary film Fix: The Ministry Movie.

Current version, Distress, present: 2017–present
In 2017, the current version of Deadly Apples was formed with the band supporting Rammstein in Canada and releasing several songs from the Petty album along with a music video for Further directed by Lamothe.  More shows were announced for 2017, including festival slots at Knotfest and Fronterizo Fest, as well as support dates for Deftones in Mexico.

In February 2018, the band sold out the National club in Montreal.  In March 2018, they toured Japan with Korn and also performed at the Vans Warped Tour in Tokyo.  In April and May, the band played several festivals in Mexico and South America including Hell & Heaven Fest, Fronterizo Fest, Vivo X El Rock, as well as several support dates with Deftones and Front 242.  In June 2018, the band played its largest hometown show to 20,000 fans on the opening night of Montebello Rockfest, as well as Machaca Festival in Mexico.

In July and August, Deadly Apples toured arenas and amphitheaters for two months with Marilyn Manson and Rob Zombie on the US Twins of Evil Tour, as well as the solo Marilyn Manson dates. The song None of Them from the Petty album was remixed by Chris Lord-Alge.

During summer 2019, they performed on the Vans Warped Tour.  In October and November 2019, they toured the US with Marilyn Manson and they announced performances at South American festivals in late November with Slipknot.  In March 2020, the band performed two days in a row at Mexico's Hell and Heaven Fest, which turned out to be the last festival in the world that wasn't canceled by the pandemic.

In June 2022, the band went on its first European tour playing major festivals like Copenhell, Rock For People, Hellfest, VOA Heavy Rock and Resurrection fest, as well as arena dates with Korn.

Work on a new album started during the pandemic with pre-production handled by producer Michael Beinhorn.  In October 2022, the band announced that they started recording the new album Distress in Los Angeles with producer Ben Grosse and Danny Lohner of Nine Inch Nails handling guitars and bass.

Band members

Current members
 Alex Martel - vocals
 Antoine Lamothe - drums, keyboards

Discography
 Infected (2008, EP)
 Petty (2017, EP)

References

Musical groups established in 2002
Musical groups from Montreal
Canadian industrial music groups
2002 establishments in Quebec

External links
Deadly Apples' official website
Deadly Apples' official Facebook